A shape-memory material is a material that can be deformed and can return to its previous shape, e.g. during heating. 

Shape-memory material may refer to:

Shape-memory alloys
Shape-memory polymers
Shape-memory ceramics.

Smart materials